The ADAC Norisring Nürnberg 200 Speedweekend (previously known as ADAC Norisring Trophäe (Norisring Trophy)) is an auto racing event taking place at the Norisring temporary street circuit in Nuremberg, Germany. First ran in 1967, the Trophy has hosted a variety of national and international series, ranging from touring cars to sports cars. The Norisring Trophy is currently part of the Deutsche Tourenwagen Masters series.

History
Sports car racing started at the Norisring in 1967 as a  exhibition event backed by the Allgemeiner Deutscher Automobil-Club (ADAC) without any championship affiliation. By 1970 the event had become part of the Interserie championship calendar, remaining as the Trophy event even when it began to share with the new Deutsche Rennsport Meisterschaft (DRM) series in 1973. The DRM however became the holder of the Norisring Trophy from 1974 to 1977, with an exception for 1975 when it was awarded to a European GT Championship race.

Although the DRM continued to run at the Norisring, a non-championship race was held for the Norisring Trophy for a variety of years from 1978 to 1985. After the demise of the DRM at the end of 1985, the new ADAC Supercup series ran the Norisring Trophy, although the event was shared with the World Sports-Prototype Championship in 1986 and 1987. The Supercup series was however short lived, and in 1990 the Norisring Trophy switched to touring car series.

The national Deutsche Tourenwagen Meisterschaft series picked the Norisring Trophy as one of their events, holding twin races every year until 1996 (when the series ran under the International Tour Car Championship guise). This series too did not last, and a series based on the global Super Touring formula took over, running twin races until 1999.

A new Deutsche Tourenwagen Masters series was developed in 2000, and they once again competed for the Norisring Trophy. Their first year they used the twin race format before a single, longer race became the standard in 2001.

This race was also known after the death of Pedro Rodríguez during the 1971 event.

Other races
The Norisring race weekend combines a variety of series and racing formats. However, only one race each year is designated the Norisring Trophy. This race, usually the longest race of the event at approximately 200 miles, is supported by several smaller series which run equal or shorter distances. Although the DRM raced at the Norisring every year from 1974 to 1985, it served as the support race several times. The BMW M1 Procar Championship also raced at the Norisring in 1980. The ADAC GT Masters sports car series currently serves as the support race for the DTM at the Norisring.

Trophy winners

External links
 Norisring History
 ADAC International Norisring Race winners

Sports car races
Touring car races
World Sportscar Championship races
Sport in Nuremberg
Deutsche Tourenwagen Masters